The Government of Brunei Darussalam allows citizens of specific countries/territories to travel to Brunei for tourism or business for up to 90, 30 or 14 days without having to obtain a visa.

All visitors must hold a passport valid for 6 months.

Visa policy map

Visa-exempt nationalities
Nationals of the following 56 countries and territories can visit Brunei without obtaining a visa for a maximum stated stay of 90, 30 or 14 days:

Visa on arrival
Nationals of the following 7 countries and territories may obtain a visa on arrival for a fee at Brunei International Airport. The availability of the type of visas obtainable on arrival depends on nationality.

1 — A single entry visa for B$20 or a multiple entry visa for B$30, valid for 30 days:
2 — A single entry visa for B$20, valid for 30 days
3 — A single entry visa for B$20, valid for 14 days

Transit visa
Passengers transiting through Brunei International Airport for less than 24 hours do not require a visa.

Those traveling to a third country can obtain a transit visa on arrival for a maximum stay of 72 hours. This does not apply to nationals of Cuba, Israel and North Korea. Nationals of Bangladesh, India, Iran, Pakistan and Sri Lanka must have a sponsor such as an airline or a travel agent.

Non-ordinary passports
Holders of diplomatic or official/service passports of Bangladesh, China, India, Iran, Kuwait, Mongolia, Morocco, Pakistan and Tajikistan do not require a visa to visit Brunei.

APEC Business Travel Card
Holders of passports issued by the following countries who possess an APEC Business Travel Card (ABTC) containing the code "BRN" on the back of the card can enter Brunei visa-free for business trips for up to 90 days.

ABTCs are issued to nationals of:

Admission restrictions 

COVID-19 pandemic 
During the COVID-19 pandemic, entry was not allowed for persons who had previously visited China, Iran or Italy.

Visa overstaying
Immigration offenses, such as visa overstaying, are punishable by jail, fines and caning.

Statistics
Most visitors arriving to Brunei on short-term basis in 2011 were from the following countries of nationality:

See also

Visa requirements for Bruneian citizens
Bruneian passport

References

External links
Ministry of Foreign Affairs & Trade Visa Information

Brunei
Government of Brunei